Rosca or Roșca may refer to:

Rosca, a Spanish bread dish
Rosca de reyes, a variant thereof
Rotating Savings and Credit Association, a type of organization
Roșca, a Romanian surname
Madeleine Rosca, Australian artist
Monika Rosca, Polish pianist and actress
Ninotchka Rosca, Filipina author
Roscas (Filipino cuisine), a Filipino cookie

See also 
 Roșcani (disambiguation)